ChangeLab is a grassroots think tank located in downtown Oakland, California with a satellite location in Seattle, Washington.

History

ChangeLab was founded in Seattle, Washington in 2010. Soya Jung and Scot Nakagawa are senior partners. 
<re</ref> ChangeLab is a progressive racial equity think/act laboratory engaging leaders across a broad spectrum of sectors, including government, the private sector, the arts, and progressive advocacy organizations.

Media
ChangeLab has published research papers, including the November 2012 "Left or Right of the Color Line: Asian Americans and the Racial Justice Movement" and the April 2013 "The Importance of Asian Americans? It's Not What You Think", A Different Asian American Timeline, and What They Talk About When They Talk About Us: Asian Americans on the Sunday Shows, an examination of coverage of Asian Americans on MSNBC in 2013-2014. 

ChangeLab's blog is called Race Files. Bloggers include Scot Nakagawa, Soya Jung, and Alison Roh Park. Guest bloggers include Deepa Iyer, Prerna Lal, Esther Wang, Naomi Ishisaka, Simon Tam, PaKou Her, Helena Wong, Daniel Hosang, and Yong Chan Miller. Topics on the blog include affirmative action, racism (particularly anti-Asian racism), Asian Americans, civil rights, and white supremacy.

Notes

External links

Asian-American culture in Oakland, California
Asian-American culture in Seattle
Asian-American issues
Think tanks based in the United States